Ahmed Ali Hussein  is a former Iraqi football goalkeeper who played for Iraq at the 1996 AFC Asian Cup. He played for Iraq between 1986 and 1996.

He was third choice keeper at the 1996 AFC Asian Cup.

References

Iraqi footballers
Iraq international footballers
Al-Shorta SC players
1996 AFC Asian Cup players
Association football goalkeepers